Fredrick Femi Oniga is a Nigerian basketball coach.  In 2011 he coached the Applied Science University (ASU) from Jordan in the 2011 FIBA Asia Champions Cup.

Teams coached
  Niger Potters
  Al Jalaa (2001)
  Nigeria national basketball team (Assistant Coach, 2003)
  Al Jazeera Amman (2005)
  Iran national basketball team (2006)
  Al-Ittihad
  Jordan national basketball team (2007)
  Al-Ahli (2007–08)
  Applied Science University (2011)

References

Nigerian basketball coaches
Nigerian expatriates in Bahrain
Living people
Year of birth missing (living people)
Place of birth missing (living people)